Sir Gilbert de la Hay (died 1263), third feudal baron of Errol in Gowrie, was co-Regent of Scotland in 1255 during the minority of King Alexander III of Scotland and Sheriff of Perth in 1262.

Life
Gilbert was the son of David de la Hay and Helen de Strathern. As part of his marriage dower of Idonea Comyn he received Upper Coull, Aberdeenshire. He was co-Regent of Scotland in 1255 during the minority of King Alexander III of Scotland and was the Sheriff of Perth in 1262. He died while in office as sheriff.

Marriage and issue
Gilbert married Lady Idonea Comyn, daughter of William Comyn, jure uxoris Earl of Buchan and Marjory, Countess of Buchan, they had the following known issue:
Nicholas, married Joan, had issue.

Citations

References

1263 deaths
Gilbert I
13th-century Scottish people
Medieval Scottish knights